Chamaelirium is a genus of flowering plants containing the single species Chamaelirium luteum, commonly known as blazing-star, devil's bit, false unicorn, fairy wand, and helonias. It is a perennial herb native to the eastern United States. It can be found in a variety of habitats, including wet meadows and deciduous woodlands.

Chamaelirium luteum has a basal rosette of around six 8–15 cm leaves, from which a single spike-like raceme inflorescence (1–1.5 cm diameter, 8–30 cm length) emerges. The plants are generally dioecious, with male-biased gender ratios in a given population.  This is due to higher mortality of female plants, and the tendency of female plants to flower less frequently. Female stalks tend to be taller, giving a total maximum plant height of about 1.2 m, but also tend to have about ten times fewer flowers.

Chamaelirium luteum is the only member of its monotypic genus, and is quite rare at the fringes of its range.

Distribution
Chamaelirium luteum can be found in temperate North America, United States and Canada. It occurs in the east of the Mississippi and it is historically known from southern Ontario.

Etymology
The etymology of Chamaelirium luteum comes from the Greek and means: Chamai = "on the ground", leirion = "lilly", lutes = "yellow".

Cultivation
Because Chamaelirium luteum is normally collected wild, it is at risk of extinction. Cultivation techniques are still under development to satisfy the demand from the market.

Site selection

Chamaelirium luteum prefers moist, well drained and acidic soil (pH: 4.5 – 6) with a high humus content. In open fields it should be shaded by a shading structure, to protect it from the direct radiation of the sun. For forest cultivation it should be preferably planted in an area with tall hardwood trees.

Planting
Chamaelirium luteum can be propagated through seeds or root division.

For propagation through root division the rhizomes can be divided by cutting them into pieces of 1/4 inch (6mm). This disc-shaped pieces should be left to callus over night and can be planted in pots on the next day. The soil should be kept moist and shaded until the plants emerge. Young plants can be transplanted in a well prepared growing bed with a high organic matter in a planting distance of 6–10 inch (15–25 cm). To support the plants with nutrients, pine needles, rotted conifer-derived sawdust or bark mulch should be added to the top soil. 
  
For propagation through seeds, the seeds should be sown in late Fall or early Winter to a depth of 1/8 inch (3 mm) in breeding beds with high humus content. For a good germination the seed should go through stratification. The plants grow best in soil mixture of peat moss and decomposed pine needles. When the young plants emerge they should be left in undisturbed at least for one growing season. Then they can be transplanted as for the propagation method through root division.

Maintenance
The plant should be moist and shaded and protected from herbivory by snails and slugs or deer in woods. Weeds should always be removed.

Uses
Chamaelirium luteum is used as ornamental or medical herb. Historically it has been used widely by Indigenous peoples.

It was traditionally used to prevent miscarriages and it has the reputation of improving fertility.
Today it is used to treat menstrual problems, pregnancy complaints, fertility issues, ovarian cysts
and diuretic

The rhizomes can be harvested after six years and is done in Fall after collecting the mature seeds.
After removing the soil and the roots from other plants, the rhizome should be stored unwashed until further processing. It should be prevented from drying out and also from too high moisture, which could lead to mold infestation. Before processing, the rhizome should be washed carefully.

Bioactive components
The bioactive components are a mixture of steroidal saponins, including chamaelirin and aglycone diosgenin. These bioactive substances act as an emmenagogue, diuretic and emetic.

References

External links
 Henriettes Herbal

Melanthiaceae
Pharmacognosy
Melanthiaceae genera
Flora of the Northeastern United States
Flora of the Southeastern United States
Flora of the Great Lakes region (North America)
Flora of Ontario
Monotypic Liliales genera
Flora of Illinois
Dioecious plants